Fumihiro Suzuki (鈴木 郁洋, born May 23, 1975) is a retired Japanese professional baseball catcher and current coach for the Orix Buffaloes in Japan's Nippon Professional Baseball. He previously played with the Chunichi Dragons and the Osaka Kintetsu Buffaloes. Suzuki also played for Team Japan at the 2000 Olympics.

External links

NPB.com

1975 births
Living people
Baseball people from Fukushima Prefecture
Chunichi Dragons players
Osaka Kintetsu Buffaloes players
Orix Buffaloes players
Olympic baseball players of Japan
Baseball players at the 2000 Summer Olympics
Japanese baseball coaches
Nippon Professional Baseball coaches